Prior to its uniform adoption of proportional representation in 1999, the United Kingdom used first-past-the-post for the European elections in England, Scotland and Wales. The European Parliament constituencies used under that system were smaller than the later regional constituencies and only had one Member of the European Parliament each. The constituency of London North East was one of them.

Boundaries
1979-1984: Bethnal Green and Bow; Chingford; Hackney Central; Hackney North and Stoke Newington; Hackney South and Shoreditch; Leyton; Newham North West; Newham South; Stepney and Poplar; Walthamstow.

1984-1999: Bethnal Green and Stepney; Bow and Poplar; Chingford; Hackney North and Stoke Newington; Hackney South and Shoreditch; Leyton; Newham North West; Newham South; Walthamstow.

Members of the European Parliament

Election results

References

External links
 David Boothroyd's United Kingdom Election Results

North East
20th century in London
1979 establishments in England
1999 disestablishments in England
Constituencies established in 1979
Constituencies disestablished in 1999